John William Fuller (3 July 1905 – 16 October 1967) was a Canadian sprinter. He competed in the men's 400 metres at the 1924 Summer Olympics.

References

External links
 

1905 births
1967 deaths
Athletes (track and field) at the 1924 Summer Olympics
Canadian male sprinters
Olympic track and field athletes of Canada
Athletes from Montreal